Dalmannia nigriceps is a species in the family Conopidae ("thick-headed flies"), in the order Diptera ("flies").

References

Further reading

External links
Diptera.info
NCBI Taxonomy Browser, Dalmannia nigriceps

Conopidae